Christopher S. "Christie" Flanagan Jr. (December 8, 1905 – March 22, 1991), also known as Christy Flanagan in certain Notre Dame materials was an All-American college football player for Knute Rockne's Notre Dame Fighting Irish. He scored the touchdown to beat Army in 1926. He ran for over 1,800 yards and 15 touchdowns in his career.

Head coaching record

References

External links
 

1905 births
1991 deaths
American football halfbacks
Duquesne Dukes athletic directors
Duquesne Dukes football coaches
Navy Midshipmen football coaches
Notre Dame Fighting Irish football players
Purdue Boilermakers football coaches
Saint Louis Billikens football coaches
All-American college football players
Sportspeople from Beaumont, Texas
Coaches of American football from Texas
Players of American football from Texas